George Barnes (26 September 1876 – 1946) was an English footballer who played in the Football League for Bolton Wanderers, Darwen, Glossop and New Brighton Tower.

References

1876 births
1946 deaths
English footballers
Association football forwards
English Football League players
Darwen F.C. players
Bolton Wanderers F.C. players
Portsmouth F.C. players
New Brighton Tower F.C. players
Glossop North End A.F.C. players
Tranmere Rovers F.C. players